Opole is a Polish parliamentary constituency that is coterminous with the Opole Voivodeship.  It elects thirteen members of the Sejm and three members of the Senate.

The district has the number '21' for elections to the Sejm and '20' for elections to the Senate, and is named after the city of Opole.  It includes the counties of Brzeg, Głubczyce, Kędzierzyn-Koźle, Kluczbork, Krapkowice, Namysłów, Nysa, Olesno, Opole, Prudnik, Strzelce, and the city county of Opole.

The constituency is unique in its relatively high support of the regional German minority party.

List of members

2019-2023

Footnotes

Electoral districts of Poland
Opole
Opole Voivodeship